Phlyarus microspinicollis is a species of beetle in the family Cerambycidae. It was described by Breuning in 1963. It is known from India.

References

Desmiphorini
Beetles described in 1963